Fay Baker (born Fay Schwager; January 31, 1917 – December 8, 1987) was an American stage, film and television actress and writer. Using the pen name Beth Holmes, she wrote the novel, The Whipping Boy. She also published, under her own name, My Darling, Darling Doctors.

Early years
Baker's father was a surgeon, and her mother was a pharmacist. She attended Smith College.

Career
Roles on radio soap operas provided Baker's early professional acting experience. Her Broadway career began in 1938 with a role in Danton's Death. Her final Broadway role was in Wonderful Journey (1946). She changed her name to Baker (from her mother's family) in 1944 in Another Love Story at New York's Fulton Theatre. She was "discovered" by Alfred Hitchcock in 1946 and given the role of Ethel in Notorious. While the part was minor, she told her daughter that Hitchcock made her stay on the set for the entire film shoot. The director felt that she should be standing by at all times because he was paying her salary. She claimed she had a larger role in the film but that much of her work had been cut from the final film. 

Baker remained in Hollywood for nearly two decades, acting in two dozen films, including star billing in The House on Telegraph Hill (1950). She had one of the leading roles in the 1950 crime drama Double Deal, and later played one of Ethel Barrymore's two daughters trying to seize control of and sell editor Humphrey Bogart's newspaper in the 1952 drama Deadline - U.S.A..

During her California years, she also appeared frequently on television. She is credited with guest parts on 30 different series beginning with Your Show Time in 1949 up to her final performance on Dr. Kildare in 1963. Her roles included comedy sitcoms (Hazel, The Donna Reed Show), drama (Perry Mason), and westerns (Have Gun - Will Travel).  In 1958, she made two guest appearances on Perry Mason, playing Marian Newburn in "The Case of the Demure Defendant" and Stephanie Sabin in "The Case of the Perjured Parrot".

Prior to 1963, Baker began writing when a problem with her back prevented her from acting. She began work on a book and sold some nonfiction pieces to magazines, in addition to receiving $50,000 from a producer for one of her stories.

Personal life
Baker married writer/producer Arthur Weiss on August 3, 1940 in Manhattan. They had two children, her son Jonathan was born in 1950, before divorcing in 1965. While Weiss remained in California working for Irwin Allen, she returned to New York with her two children and began a new career as an author.

After her son Jonathan died from a drug overdose in 1971, Baker dedicated herself to the topic of how parents enable bad behavior in children. This inspired her most successful novel, The Whipping Boy (1978), which focused on the "emotional abuse" of children. She used the pen name "Beth Holmes" to shield her family from being compared with fictional characters in the novel.

Baker was diagnosed with breast cancer in 1972 and described the experience humorously in her book My Darling, Darling Doctors in 1975. She lost her 15-year battle with breast cancer on December 8, 1987 at age 70.

TV appearances

Filmography

Playlist

References

External links

 
 

1917 births
1987 deaths
Actresses from New York (state)
American film actresses
American television actresses
American stage actresses
American women novelists
Deaths from breast cancer
Deaths from cancer in New York (state)
People from New York City
People from Sleepy Hollow, New York
20th-century American actresses
20th-century American novelists
20th-century American women writers
Novelists from New York (state)
 Smith College alumni
20th-century pseudonymous writers
Pseudonymous women writers